Luz Helena Sarmiento Villamizar is a Colombian geologist, and a former Minister of Environment and Sustainable Development of Colombia, serving in the administration of President Juan Manuel Santos Calderón. The former Director of the National Authority of Environmental Licenses (ANLA); a Colombian government agency in charge of licensing mining, energy, and infrastructure projects; she graduated from the Industrial University of Santander, and previously worked in the energy sector.

Minister of Environment
On 5 September 2013, as part of a planned cabinet reshuffle, President Santos announced the appointment of Sarmiento as the new Minister of Environment and Sustainable Development. Sarmiento was sworn in on 11 September succeeding Juan Gabriel Uribe Vegalara in the post. She was succeeded by Gabriel Vallejo as Minister of Environment in August 2014.

References

External links

Date of birth missing (living people)
Living people
Industrial University of Santander alumni
Ministers of Environment and Sustainable Development of Colombia
Year of birth missing (living people)